The Vitality Netball World Cup 2023  will be the sixteenth staging of the premier competition in international netball, contested every four years. The tournament will be held from Friday, 28 July to Sunday, 6 August at the International Convention Centre in Cape Town, South Africa. This will mark the first time the tournament will be held in Africa.

Organisation

The host city and venue was announced by the International Netball Federation (INF) on 8 March 2019, only months prior to the staging of the 2019 edition in Liverpool, England. Cape Town's bid, supported by the South African Government and the Western Cape province, was selected by the INF ahead of a bid by Auckland, New Zealand. The INF stated the Cape Town bid would "deliver a greater impact on the development of global netball" and cited the pledges by the South African Government to invest heavily in preparation and development of the sport in the lead-up to the tournament.

Venue
All matches at the event will be held at the Cape Town International Convention Centre.

Mascot
In August 2022, the mascot was revealed for the tournament following a public competition. Designed by 11-year-old Violet Cassidy from Manchester, England; the mascot is an anthromorphic meerkat named Letsasi, meaning "sun."

Teams

Sixteen teams will contest the 2022 title. Six teams qualify automatically: the hosts, and the top five (other) teams in the World Netball Rankings. The remaining ten places are filled via five regional tournaments, with two teams qualifying from each.

Teams which qualify automatically (in order of world ranking):
 
 
 
 
  (hosts)
 

Qualification tournaments

Match officials

Umpires

Umpire Appointments Panel

Broadcasters
This is a list of the broadcasters for the tournament in competing countries and regions. For the first time in history, the event will be recorded and produced by an all women crew from SuperSport (MultiChoice).

References

External links
 Announcement of Host City – International Netball Federation

  
Netball World Cup
2023 in netball
2023 in South African sport
Sports competitions in Cape Town
International netball competitions hosted by South Africa
2020s in Cape Town
Netball
Netball World Cup
Netball World Cup